The 1989 Los Angeles Dodgers season marked the 100th season for the franchise in Major League Baseball, having joined the National League in 1890 after six seasons in the American Association. It also marked their 32nd season in Los Angeles, California.

The team came down to earth after the success of the 1988 season, finishing further down in the standings falling to fourth place in the Western Division of the National League.

Offseason
December 4, 1988: Acquired Eddie Murray from the Baltimore Orioles for Juan Bell, Brian Holton and Ken Howell.
March 11, 1989: Acquired Mike Morgan from the Baltimore Orioles for Mike Devereaux.

Regular season

Season standings

Record vs. opponents

Notable games
 June 3–4, 1989: The Dodgers lost 5–4 in 22 innings to the Houston Astros when Jeff Hamilton allowed a RBI single to Rafael Ramírez, scoring Bill Doran. The game lasted 7 hours, 14 minutes and did not finish until 2:49 a.m. Central time (12:49 a.m. Pacific). KTTV, which normally aired a postgame show in this era, canceled it on this night and went straight to a newscast. Whether it was due to the length of the game or due to the confluence of two huge breaking news stories (the death of Ayatollah Khomeini and the Tiananmen Square massacre) was never publicly revealed.
 August 23–24, 1989: The Dodgers played another 22-inning game, this one against the Montreal Expos. It eventually ended when Rick Dempsey homered for the Dodgers in the top half of the 22nd inning off Expos pitcher Dennis Martínez, who was making a very rare relief performance; the Dodgers won 1–0 in what was the Expos' longest game ever. Rex Hudler would be caught stealing second in the bottom half of the 22nd to end the game. The game almost ended earlier when an Expo scored from third on a sacrifice fly. The Dodgers' appeal, that the runner left the base too soon, was recognized by the third base umpire and the third out was recorded. The game also marked the first time a mascot was ejected by an umpire. When Youppi! dressed in a nightgown and nightcap pretended to go to sleep on top of the Dodgers' dugout, Dodgers' manager Tommy Lasorda demanded that Youppi! be run from the game. In the end, the game took over 6 hours to finish and ended close to 2 a.m. Eastern time (11 p.m. PT).

Opening Day lineup

Roster

Notable transactions
July 18, 1989: Acquired Kal Daniels and Lenny Harris from the Cincinnati Reds for Mariano Duncan and Tim Leary.
July 18, 1989: Acquired Billy Bean from the Detroit Tigers for Domingo Michel and Steve Green.

Player stats

Batting

Starters by position
Note: Pos = Position; G = Games played; AB = At bats; H = Hits; Avg. = Batting average; HR = Home runs; RBI = Runs batted in

Other batters
Note: G = Games played; AB = At bats; H = Hits; Avg. = Batting average; HR = Home runs; RBI = Runs batted in

Pitching

Starting pitchers
Note: G = Games pitched; IP = Innings pitched; W = Wins; L = Losses; ERA = Earned run average; SO = Strikeouts

Other pitchers
Note: G = Games pitched; IP = Innings pitched; W = Wins; L = Losses; ERA = Earned run average; SO = Strikeouts

Relief pitchers
Note: G = Games pitched; W = Wins; L = Losses; SV = Saves; ERA = Earned run average; SO = Strikeouts

1989 Awards
1989 Major League Baseball All-Star Game
Orel Hershiser reserve
Jay Howell reserve
Willie Randolph reserve
Mike Scioscia reserve
NL Pitcher of the Month
Tim Belcher (September 1989)
NL Player of the Week
José González (June 26 – July 2)
Jay Howell (July 31 – Aug. 6)
Tim Belcher (Aug. 21–27)

Farm system

Teams in BOLD won League Championships

Major League Baseball Draft

The Dodgers drafted 65 players in this draft. Of those, seven of them would eventually play Major League baseball. The Dodgers had three first round picks this season as they gained the New York Yankees first round pick and a supplemental pick for the loss of free agent Steve Sax. They also gained an extra second round pick from the Cleveland Indians as compensation for the loss of pitcher Jesse Orosco.

With their first pick in the 1st round, the Dodgers selected pitcher Kiki Jones from Hillsborough High School in Tampa, Florida. Despite concerns that he was too small to make it, the Dodgers drafted him and their scouting director said "he's got the best arm around and the best curveball in the country." He was 8–0 with a 1.58 ERA his first season in the rookie leagues with the Great Falls Dodgers but then began to experience arm injuries and legal problems. The Dodgers released him after the 1993 season, though he attempted comebacks in 1998–1999 and 2001. In 8 total minor league seasons he was 23–20 with a 4.13 ERA in 77 games (61 starts).

Their next first round pick was outfielder Tom Goodwin from California State University, Fresno. He would play 14 seasons in the Majors (5 of them with the Dodgers) and hit .268 while stealing 369 bases. The supplemental pick was pitcher Jamie McAndrew of the University of Florida. He was subsequently selected by the Florida Marlins in the 1992 expansion draft and eventually pitched in 15 games in the Majors with the Milwaukee Brewers in 1995 and 1997.

The most successful pick was Eric Young drafted in the 43rd round out of Rutgers University as an outfielder. He was selected by the Colorado Rockies in the 1992 expansion draft and spent most of his 15-season career as a second baseman. He hit .283 in 1,730 career games with 79 homers, 543 RBI and 465 steals while playing with seven different teams.

References

External links
1989 Los Angeles Dodgers uniform
Los Angeles Dodgers official web site
Baseball-Reference season page
Baseball Almanac season page

Los Angeles Dodgers seasons
Los Angeles Dodgers
Los Angeles Dodgers
Los